The 2019 Asia Rugby Sevens Series was the eleventh edition of Asia's continental sevens circuit. The lower-tier Trophy tournament, hosted in Indonesia, served as a qualifier, with the top team qualifying for the main series hosted in South Korea, China, and Sri Lanka.

Teams

Asia Rugby Sevens Trophy

 
 
 
 
 
 
 
 
 
 
 
  (Relegated from 2018 Asia Rugby Sevens Series)

Asia Rugby Sevens Series

 
 
 
 
 
 
 
  (Promoted from 2018 Asia Rugby Sevens Trophy)

Schedule
The official schedule for the 2019 Asia Rugby Sevens Series was:

Trophy

The men's trophy event was held on 10–11 August at the Gelora Bung Karno Sports Complex in Jakarta, Indonesia.

Placings

Pool stage

Pool A

Pool B

Pool C

Pool D

Knockout stage

5th–8th bracket

Cup playoffs

Series standings
Final standings over the three legs of the 2019 Asia Rugby Sevens Series:

Incheon
The Korean leg of the series was held from 31 August to 1 September in Incheon.

Pool stage

Pool A

Pool B

Knockout stage

5th–8th bracket

Cup playoffs

Source: Asia Rugby

Huizhou
The China leg of the series was held on 14–15 September in Huizhou.

Pool stage

Pool A

Pool B

Knockout stage

5th–8th bracket

Cup playoffs

Source: Asia Rugby

Colombo
The Sri Lanka leg of the series was held on 28–29 September in Colombo.

Pool stage

Pool A

Pool B

Knockout stage

5th–8th bracket

Cup playoffs

Source: Asia Rugby

See also
 2019 Asia Rugby Women's Sevens Series

References

2019
2019 rugby sevens competitions
2019 in Asian rugby union
International rugby union competitions hosted by Indonesia
International rugby union competitions hosted by South Korea
International rugby union competitions hosted by China
International rugby union competitions hosted by Sri Lanka
rugby union
rugby union
rugby union
rugby union